The word Tebu can refer to

 the Tubu people in Chad, Niger and Libya
 the Tebu languages spoken by the Tubu people
 Tebu is also a name for sugar cane in Indonesia
 TEBU Abrv. in railroad terminology, a "Tractive Effort Booster Unit", or Slug
 Teerbedrijf Uithoorn (TEBU), Dutch coal tar processing company
 Tebu mountain, high point in Apetina, Suriname
Xtep, Chinese sports equipment manufacturer